Reef Island is an artificial island in the archipelago of Bahrain.

History
In 2000, a plan was proposed by a group called Lulu Island Development to develop a housing project at Bahrain. 
in August 2004 Construction began on the island. The investors were Lulu Tourism Company (a subsidiary of Mouawad Group), and the Government of Bahrain, 50% each. 
Cost of the Project: $1.5 billion

Description
Designed by Spowers and Pentago, the housing project comprises a five star hotel resort, waterfront apartments, yacht club, boutique retail, villas, a spa hotel, lagoon apartments, a thirty floors apartment tower, marine retail, theater/exhibition halls and a marina.

All buildings are developed in a landscaped garden setting unique to Bahrain. Access for yachts up to 110 meters in length is provided and a number of beaches enhance the relaxed lifestyle inherent in Reef Island.

Demography
There are several housing projects on the island, the major one is Le-Reef.
Another big ones are Marina reef  and Venice reef.

Administration
The island belongs to Capital Governorate.

Transportation
There is a causeway connecting Reef Island with Manama on Bahrain Island.

Image gallery

References 

Populated places in the Capital Governorate, Bahrain
Islands of Bahrain
Artificial islands of Bahrain